The Third Watch is a 1924 German silent drama film directed by  and starring Carlo Aldini, Claire Rommer, and Kurt Brenkendorf. Its art director was Willi Herrmann.

Cast

References

Bibliography

External links

1924 films
Films of the Weimar Republic
Films directed by Karl Gerhardt
German silent feature films
Films with screenplays by Franz Schulz
German black-and-white films
German drama films
1924 drama films
Phoebus Film films
Silent drama films
1920s German films